Balvbin (also Romanized as Balvbīn and Balūbīn; also known as Balugan) is a village in Ijrud-e Pain Rural District, Halab District, Ijrud County, Zanjan Province, Iran. At the 2006 census, its population was 66, in 23 families.
Jafari is one of the main families originating in the village. Many of the residents migrated to Tehran choosing bakery as the main profession.
It is currently used by old residents as a holiday destination over warmer summer months. Its population is only 3 families over the winter with Torab Dayee being the main resident and contributor keeping the village alive.

References 

Populated places in Ijrud County